Hard Knocks Fighting is a mixed martial arts (MMA) promotion in North America. Hard Knocks Fighting was founded in 2009 by Canadian Olympic wrestler Ari Taub. Hard Knocks Fighting is known for its local fighter support and ongoing charity efforts and where Ronda Rousey secured her second career MMA victory.

History

Founding
In 2009, Canadian Olympic wrestler Ari Taub founded Hard Knocks Fighting. 
Ari Taub an Olympic wrestler and Calgary based lawyer overcomes local city bylaws to win legal challenges to get MMA sanctioned in Calgary.
In December 2011, media giant ESPN began airing Hard Knocks Fighting in 40 countries and over 50 million homes. Hard Knocks Fighting produces 15 live events annually, as well as shoulder programming including feature fights, highlight shows, and documentaries.

Television Broadcasting
 December, 2011 - Hard Knocks Fighting begins broadcasting on ESPN.
 June, 2013 - Hard Knocks Fighting begins broadcasting on Popcornflix.
 January, 2015 - Hard Knocks Fighting and MoboVivo launch HKFC MMA App 
 January, 2015 - Hard Knocks Fighting begins live broadcasts on Fight Network.

Past events

Broadcast partners
 ESPN - Hard Knocks Fighting airs live on ESPN. 
 Fight Network
 Popcornflix
OSN
Claro Sports
AT&T
Time Warner Cable
Comcast/Charter Sports Southeast
Verizon Communications
PlayStation
Dish Network
BandSports
beIN Sports
FightBox

Current champions

Notable fighters
 Ronda Rousey the first  UFC Women's Bantamweight Champion and first American woman to earn an Olympic medal in Judo at the Summer Olympics in Beijing in 2008, where she faced kickboxing champion Charmaine Tweet in an MMA bout at Hard Knocks Fighting Championship: School of Hard Knocks 12 on June 17, 2011 in Calgary, Alberta, Canada. She submitted Tweet with an armbar in 49 seconds.
 Elias Theodorou is the winner of HKFC: School of Hard Knocks 14. Method- Submission (rear naked choke).
 Misha Cirkunov is an MMA fighter out of Ontario, Canada. Misha Cirkunov knocked out Rodney Wallace at Hard Knocks Fighting Championship.

References

External links

 

Sports organizations established in 2009
Mixed martial arts organizations
Mixed martial arts television shows